The Director-General of the GCSB is the leader of the Government Communications Security Bureau, commonly abbreviated as the GCSB. The organisation is considered the most powerful and influential of the New Zealand intelligence agencies, and has been headed by Andrew Hampton since April 2016. The Director-General of the GCSB is appointed by the Prime Minister without the consultation of Parliament, and the Director makes reports directly to him or her.

References

New Zealand intelligence agencies